Jules Henriet  (13 February 1918 – 27 November 1997), was a Belgian football player. He evolved from midfielder to defender in Sporting Charleroi and the Belgium national football team. He played 15 matches with the Red Devils between 1940 and 1949,during which he was 8 times captain in charge. He play 233 games and score 4 goals in the highest Level.

He ended his career as trainer-player in RAEC Mons from 1956 to 1959.

References

1918 births
1997 deaths
Belgian footballers
R. Charleroi S.C. players
R.A.E.C. Mons players
Belgium international footballers
Belgian Pro League players
Association football forwards